Amelio Poggi (9 October 1914 – 23 December 1974) was an Italian prelate of the Catholic Church who spent his career in the diplomatic service of the Holy See, including stints as Apostolic Nuncio in Rwanda, Uganda, and Syria.

Biography
Amelio Poggi was born in Bibbiena in the Province of Arezzo on 9 October 1914. He was ordained a priest on 8 August 1937.

To prepare for a diplomatic career he entered the Pontifical Ecclesiastical Academy in 1947.

On 27 May 1967, Pope Paul VI named him a titular archbishop and Apostolic Nuncio to Burundi and to Rwanda. He received his episcopal consecration from Pope Paul on 16 July 1967. On 5 August 1967, he was appointed the Pro-Nuncio to Uganda as well.

On 27 November 1969, Pope Paul appointed him Apostolic Delegate to Central-Western Africa.

On 26 September 1973, Pope Paul named him Apostolic Pro-Nuncio to Syria.

He died on 23 December 1974.

Notes

References

External links
Catholic Hierarchy: Archbishop Amelio Poggi 

1914 births
1974 deaths
Pontifical Ecclesiastical Academy alumni
Apostolic Nuncios to Syria
Apostolic Nuncios to Uganda
Apostolic Nuncios to Rwanda
People from the Province of Arezzo